The Legnica coal mine is a large mine in the west of Poland in Legnica, Lower Silesian Voivodeship, 355 km west of the capital, Warsaw. Legnica represents one of the largest coal reserve in Poland having estimated reserves of 2,504 million tonnes of coal. The annual coal production is around 27 million tonnes.

References

External links 
 Official site

Coal mines in Poland
Buildings and structures in Lower Silesian Voivodeship